Joshua is a city in Johnson County, Texas, United States.

History

The plat for Joshua was first surveyed in 1880, and the community was organized in 1881 when the railroad arrived. The first store, opened in 1882 by W. L. West, also housed the post office.  The railroad shipped farm produce, Joshua's largest export. The first one-room school opened in 1890, and in 1899, it moved into a new building. In 1917, this school became Joshua High School. In 1900 and 1912, Joshua suffered major fires. In spite of this, new businesses continued to open. The Citizen's Banking Company, opened in 1904, was run by J. W. Spencer. Two years later, a public water system began. Truck gardens, orchards, and corn and cotton farms surrounded Joshua.

In 1912, the Fort Worth South Traction Line began to provide interurban rail service from Cleburne to Fort Worth, with a stop in Joshua. Service stopped in 1932 because of the growing importance of automobile travel. The first car in Joshua was purchased in 1913. By 1914, the community had a population of 824, two cotton gins, an ice plant, a bank, a newspaper named the Joshua Star, and four churches. Local farms grew cotton and potatoes.

In the mid-1950s, Joshua was incorporated, with Ted Strube as the first mayor. The population dropped to 550 during the 1950s and rose to 924 in 1970. By 1980, it was 1,470. Because of its proximity to Fort Worth, the population grew to 3,828 by 1990. Joshua had 14 businesses in 1970 and 58 in 1980, when seven local manufacturers made such items as aluminum products, boat trailers, leather goods, and windows. The Joshua Tribune began publication in 1970 and was published until the early 1990s, when it moved to Burleson.

William Leech West, a Confederate Civil War veteran born in Alabama, but more recently from Mississippi, owned a large farm to the east of the town of Caddo Grove. Family legend says that upon arriving in Texas, he temporarily left his wife and children in the wagon yards in Fort Worth and rode a horse south. His intent was to find an area with no fences. He journeyed for several days until he found the area he liked near the geographic feature of Caddo Peak in Johnson County.

W.L. West owned and operated a grocery store and post office in Caddo Grove, until the railroad bypassed the small community. Along with the rest of the businessmen of Caddo Grove, he moved the entire building housing his store into Joshua when the railroad came. This building, with its actual dimensional lumber, was later dismantled in the 1940s and the salvaged wood used for an addition to his son Samuel A. West's house on Main Street in Joshua. The original house on the old West farm burned in a fire in the 1930s. The Wests donated a large portion of the land for the Caddo Grove Cemetery. His wife and he, and many of his descendants, are buried in this cemetery in a large plot near the center of the cemetery. A portion of the original homestead land is still owned by one of his grandchildren today.

W.L. West's son Samuel Abe West was a prominent citizen of Joshua for 93 years. He was an Army veteran of World War I, although he had a difficult time being accepted for enlistment due to an injury received as a child. While crossing the Atchison, Topeka and Santa Fe railroad tracks and under a stopped train, the train moved and pinched a portion of his upper arm. Due to this injury and the lack of a biceps muscle, he was only allowed to enlist in the Finance Corps. He served at Camp Travis, which is now in the location of the parade fields at Fort Sam Houston, Texas. He ended his enlistment, never serving overseas. S.A. West was mustered out as a sergeant first class paymaster. He was born in a cabin on the West homestead in 1887 and worked in various banking operations for relatives. Later, he owned the grocery store on Main Street in Joshua (where the private detective agency is located now). He was known to lend people money and food during hard times, especially the Depression. When he finally closed down the store in the early 1970s, his son and daughter found numerous unpaid IOUs. He was also a town alderman during the 1950s, a member of the First United Methodist Church and a member of the Masonic Lodge. He was one of the very few Republicans in Johnson County at the time.

Theodore "Ted" Roosevelt Strube was the first mayor of Joshua about 1949 and was one of the founders of the Masonic Lodge in Joshua. His wife, Sylvia Couch Strube, was the first florist of Joshua.

Geography
Joshua is located is bordered to the north by Burleson and to the south by Cleburne, the county seat. Texas State Highway 174 (Broadway Street) runs through the city, leading north  to the center of Burleson and south  to the center of Cleburne.

The north side of the city is drained by Village Creek, a tributary of the Trinity River, while the south side is drained by tributaries of East Buffalo Creek, flowing to the Nolan River, part of the Brazos River watershed.

A hill known as Brushy Knob stands to the west of Joshua, at a height of 1,042 feet above mean sea level.

Demographics

As of the 2020 United States census, there were 7,891 people, 2,928 households, and 2,066 families residing in the city.

Education
Public education in Joshua is provided by the Joshua Independent School District.

References

External links
 City of Joshua official site
 Joshua Area Chamber of Commerce

Dallas–Fort Worth metroplex
Cities in Texas
Cities in Johnson County, Texas
Populated places established in 1881
1881 establishments in Texas